Ni Jing: Thou Shalt Not Steal (Original ; Spanish Title Ni Jing: No Robarás) is a 2013 Spanish and Chinese co-production drama film written and directed by Roberto F. Canuto and Xu Xiaoxi. The film represents one of the rare independent film collaborations between Spain and China, together with the previous film from the directors, Desire Street. The film is based in a true story that happened to a close friend of the directors and it was shot in Chengdu, China, using the local dialect of the region, the Sichuanese Mandarin.

Ni Jing: Thou Shalt Not Steal uses a realistic approach in terms of style and storytelling and tells the story of a naive Chinese girl who is forced to confront betrayal after she awakes in a remote forest covered in blood. 
The film received the award for Best Short Film in the World Premiere at Riverside Saginaw International Film Festival, 2013 and the awards for: Best Actress (Sherry Xia Ruihong), runner up Best Short Film, and a nomination for Best Actor (Yinhui Wan) at the 9th Asturian Film Festival, 2014. The Ni Jing: No Robarás Spanish premiere took place at the prestigious FICXIXON, Gijón International Film Festival in 2013 and the Chinese premiere at the Contemporary Art Museum A4 in Chengdu (Sichuan), one of the most prestigious museums in China.

Plot
Xiaofan, a young Chinese girl who works at a Karaoke Club, awakes one morning in a remote forest with her body covered in blood. As she struggles to find her way out, she tries to understand the dramatic circumstances which got her into the situation, events mainly related to her attractive and unpredictable boyfriend.

Cast
 Sherry Ruihong Xia as Wu Xiaoxan
 Yinhui Wan as Chen Zhong
 Wenfen Zuo as Villager
 Luisa Shun Liu as Young Villager
 Josef Chen Li as Car Owner
 Alicia Barbadoux as Foreign Friend
 Ye Kuang as  Zhong's Friend

Production

Ni Jing: Thou Shalt Not Steal is the first film shot in China by the directors, after their previous experiences in Los Angeles and South Africa. The principal photography took place in the Summer 2012 and the post-production was completed in 2013.

The film was shot in real locations in Chengdu and surrounding areas, such as:  Chengdu City Center, the more traditional urban areas and mountain restaurants of the Sichuan region, the forest at Qing Chen mountain as well as different roads that connect these locations.

Ni Jing: Thou Shalt Not Steal is the first part of a trilogy called Invisible Chengdu, directed by Roberto F. Canuto and Xu Xiaoxi, following by Floating Melon (2015) and Sunken Plum (2017). The trilogy focuses on characters that usually are kept underground and discriminated in the Chinese society, and often not well represented in the silver screen.

According to the directors, in Ni Jing: Thou Shalt not steal they "wanted to represent the different ways in which young people confront relationships in Asia. The perspective is very different for males and females, and pressure from the family is really strong. We do not try to teach or give advice on how things should to be handled; our aim is just to make people think about the nature of such issues, and whether they are right or wrong. Even without exploring in depth the social or family pressures that the characters experience when making decisions (mainly for the short format and the specifics of the story), we can see in the film how these pressures affect the personalities of the characters".

Music
Ni Jing: Thou Shalt Not Steal original soundtrack is composed by Andrea Centazzo. The collaboration between the directors and the composer started in 2008, Ni Jing: Thou Shalt Not Steal being the fourth collaboration, following Mei Mei, Toto Forever and Desire Street.  According to the directors, "Andrea Centazzo always show a great interest in the oriental cultura.  He is a great artist that know how to adapt to the stories and create a unique atmosphere, and always keeping his personality in the composition". Ni Jing soundtrack is created from the point of view of the main character, Xiaofan. The music guides the emotional journey of the character through the film, moving from the initial moments of horror and confusion, using electronic music, sound effects and real instruments, until the final scenes with a more romantic themes using melodic compositions based in piano and flute. "The music help to understand the meaning from the emotion that produce".

Reception 
The film was well received in the different film festivals and events where it was screened, including some awards. At the world premiere of the film, held in the United States, Ni Jing: Thou Shalt Not Steal received the "Best Short Film" award at the 7th Riverside Saginaw International Film Festival, 2014. "Ni Jing: No Robarás" premiere in Spain at FICXIXON, 51st Gijón International Film Festival 2014 and in Perú at the "International Short Film Festival FENACO", 2013. It received three nominations (Best Short Film, Best Actress and Best Actor) at Asturian Film Festival, 2014, being awarded with the first two.  Before the actual official screenings, the producers organised a press event in Chengdu. The press reactions were positive, looking forward to the official screening:

"The film represent very truthfully the local society of Chengdu and the good communication among the directors, that belong to different cultures, creates great results", at the Fenixnet Entertainment News, China.
One of the leading newspapers of the region, Sichuan Daily, cover all the news regarding the festivals and awards received by Ni Jing: Thou Shalt Not Steal, quoting "that audiences at the press screening was captivated for the atmosphere and the rhym of the film"
The Chinese premiere was in August 2014 and took place at the Contemporary Art Museum A4 in Chengdu (Sichuan), one of the most prestigious museums in China, in the exhibition ID/EGO dedicated to the filmmakers and including a showcase of pictures and objects used during their shootings, and presenting also their previous feature film Desire Street. Due to the very positive reactions and the good turnout in all the projections, the exhibition was extended for further weeks.

Awards and nominations
(Awards won are in bold)
 Best Short Film, Riverside Saginaw International Film Festival, 2014
 Best Lead Actress - Sherry Ruihong Xia, Festival de Cine Asturianu 2014 (Asturian Film Festival)
 Best Short Film - Runner Up, Festival de Cine Asturianu 2014 (Asturian Film Festival)
 Best Actor - Yinhui Wan (Nominated), Festival de Cine Asturianu 2014 (Asturian Film Festival)

References

External links
 
 
 Ni Jing: Thou Shalt Not Steal at Douban (Chinese film website)
 Ni Jing Directors Interview Roberto F. Canuto & Xu Xiaoxi at El Rollo Higiénico, Revista de Arte y Cultura (Spanish)
 Ni Jing: Thou Shalt Not Steal (2013) at Flixster
 Ni Jing Trailer at Tudou (Chinese)
 Trailer Ni Jing: Thou Shalt Not Steal, YouTube
 Sichuan TV News Screening of Ni Jing in Chengdu at IMDB Video
 Ni Jing's Sherryy Xia Ruihong receive award Best Actress and Ni Jing Runner Up Best Short at Asturian Film Festival at "La Nueva España" Newspaper
 Ni Jing Press Screening in Chengdu, China at Ifeng News Report (Chinese)
 Ni Jing News at 好戏网 FunNET News (Chinese)
 Ni Jing and directors Xu Xiaoxi & Roberto F. Canuto Report  at Sichuan Daily Newspaper (Chinese)

2013 films
2010s mystery drama films
Films set in China
Spanish directors
Chinese mystery drama films
Spanish mystery drama films
Spanish independent films
Chinese short films
2013 independent films
Spanish short films
Chinese independent films
2013 short films
2013 drama films
2010s Mandarin-language films